Luigi Antonio Calegari (1780–1849) was an Italian opera composer, born in Padua. He was nephew of Antonio Calegari (1757–1828) and possibly related to other composers in the Padua Calegari family; Father Francesco Antonio Calegari (1656–1742), and Giuseppe Calegari, composer of a Betulia liberata (1771).  He died in Venice.

Operas
Il matrimonio scoperto ossia Le polpette (1804, Padua)
Erminia (1805, Venice)
La serenata (1806, Padua)
Amor soldato (1807, Padua)
Irene e Filandro (1808, Venice)
La giardiniera (1808, Rome)
Raoul di Crequi (1808, Padua)
Il prigioniero (1810, Venice)
Omaggio del cuore (1815, Piacenza)
Saul (1821, Venice) - inspired by the oratorio of Vittorio Alfieri.

References

1780 births
1849 deaths
19th-century classical composers
19th-century Italian composers
19th-century Italian male musicians
Italian classical composers
Italian male classical composers
Italian opera composers
Male opera composers